Fortuynia is a genus of mite of the family Fortuyniidae. The genus was described in 1960 by Thomas van der Hammen.

References

Sarcoptiformes
Acari genera